Brian Garvey may refer to:

 Brian Garvey (comics) (born 1961), comic book artist
 Brian Garvey (footballer) (born 1937), English former footballer